Eric Butorac and Jean-Julien Rojer were the defending champions, but were eliminated by Marcelo Melo and Bruno Soares in the semifinals.
Rohan Bopanna and Aisam-ul-Haq Qureshi won the title, defeating Melo and Soares in the final.

Seeds

Draw

Draw

References
 Main Draw

If Stockholm Open - Doubles
2011 Doubles